Hisaya is a masculine Japanese given name, a feminine Japanese given name and a surname. Notable people with the name include:

, Japanese actor and comedian
, Japanese manga artist born in Osaka
, Japanese weightlifter
, Japanese screenwriter

See also
Hisaya-ōdōri Station, train station in Naka-ku, Nagoya, Aichi Prefecture, Japan

Japanese unisex given names
Japanese-language surnames

de:Hisaya